Geodia gallica is a species of sponge in the family Geodiidae. The species was first described by Lendenfeld in 1907. It is found in the coastal waters of Agulhas Bank, next to South Africa.

Bibliography 
 Lendenfeld, R. von. (1907). « Die Tetraxonia. Wissenschaftliche Ergebnisse der Deutschen Tiefsee-Expedition auf der Dampfer Valdivia 1898-1899 ». 11(1-2): i-iv, 59-374, pls IX-XLVI.

References

Tetractinellida
Sponges described in 1907